Air Warrior II is a video game developed by American studio Kesmai Corporation and published by Interactive Magic for Windows. It is a sequel to Air Warrior.

Development
Development of Air Warrior II was directly overseen by Bill Stealey, founder of the game's publisher, Interactive Magic.

Gameplay
Air Warrior II is a flight simulator which allows dozens of international players to challenge each other.

Reception
Next Generation reviewed the PC version of the game, rating it four stars out of five, and stated that "AWII is a must for WWII flight enthusiasts and an excellent choice for anyone looking for a great online multiplayer game."

Reviews
Computer Gaming World #155 (Jun 1997)
PC Games - Apr, 1997
Game Revolution - Jun 05, 2004
PC Player (Germany) - Apr, 1997
Electric Games (1997)
Gamezilla (1997)
Game-Over! (Apr, 1997)
GameSpot (Mar 25, 1997)
Gamesmania.de (1997)

References

1997 video games
Combat flight simulators
Video game sequels
Video games developed in the United States
Video games scored by Daniel Bernstein
Windows games
Windows-only games
World War II video games